The voivodeship executive board is regional executive body of voivodeship's local self-government in Poland. Executive board consists of five members elected by regional assemblies. Executive board is chaired by the voivodeship marshal.

See also 
 regional assemblies
 Voivodeships of Poland
 Voivode
 Local self-government

References 

Government of Poland
Politics of Poland
Poland
Executive board